Chapelton is a market town in Clarendon Parish, Jamaica and the former parish capital.

Name
According to a longtime resident:

Amenities
Clarendon College, secondary school.
Clarendon Hospital, built c1903, now a community Type 3 hospital.
Police Station.
St Paul's Anglican Church, founded over 300 years ago.

Transport

Road
Chapelton is on the B3 road which climbs up from May Pen in the south, passes through the center of the town and continues north towards Brown's Town.

Rail
From 1925 to 1974 Chapelton was served by Chapelton railway station on the 21 mile railway branch line from May Pen to Frankfield.

Notable people from Chapelton

Dennis Alcapone
Everton Blender
Toots Hibbert
Linton Kwesi Johnson
Barrington Levy
Freddie McGregor
Raphael Morgan (Robert Josias Morgan)
Levi Roots
Jah Shaka
Cocoa Tea

See also
 List of cities and towns in Jamaica

References

External links 
 Photos:          .

Year of establishment missing
Populated places in Clarendon Parish, Jamaica